WCMU is the callsign of two public broadcasting stations in Mount Pleasant, Michigan, owned by Central Michigan University:

 WCMU-FM, a NPR member radio station at 89.5 FM
 WCMU-TV, a PBS member television station at channel 14

Both stations also have rebroadcast transmitters throughout northern Michigan.